Henry Wulff (August 24, 1854 – December 27, 1907) was a German American Republican politician who served as Clerk of Cook County from 1886 to 1894 and as Treasurer of Illinois from 1895 to 1897. At the time of the 1890 election for Cook County Clerk, he was the only man to have successfully won reelection to the office. He was a delegate to the 1892 Republican National Convention. He was later indicted by the state for embezzling thousands of dollars while serving as Treasurer, which he was forced to repay by the courts.

References

1854 births
1907 deaths
German emigrants to the United States
Politicians from Chicago
Illinois Republicans
County officials in Illinois
State treasurers of Illinois
Cook County Clerks
Politicians convicted of embezzlement